The 1998–99 La Liga season, the 68th since its establishment, started on 29 August 1998 and finished on 20 June 1999.

Promotion and relegation
Twenty teams competed in the league – the top seventeen teams from the previous season and the three teams promoted from the Segunda División. The promoted teams were Alavés (playing top flight football for the first time in forty two years), Extremadura (returning after a one-year absence) and Villarreal (playing in the top flight for the first time ever). They replaced Compostela, Mérida and Sporting Gijón after spending time in the top flight for four, one and twenty one years respectively.

Team information

Clubs and locations
 

1998–99 season was composed of the following clubs:

League table

Positions by round

Results

Relegation playoff

First Leg

Second Leg

Awards

Pichichi Trophy
The Pichichi Trophy is awarded to the player who scores the most goals in a season.

Source: Diario AS (newspaper archive, in paper), copy of the day: Monday 21 June 1999

Zamora Trophy
The Zamora Trophy is awarded to the goalkeeper with least goals to games ratio.

Source: Diario AS (newspaper archive, in paper), copy of the day: Monday 21 June 1999

Fair Play award
From this season, RFEF develops and publishes annually the Fair Play classification according to the Points System which was agreed by the board of the federation on 30 October 1998 and later expanded and fixed at another meeting and published in the 2nd Mailshot of the 2000–01 season. The classification for this season was computed from the Second legg, in order to experience results.

Source: Mundo Deportivo (newspaper archive, web)

Pedro Zaballa award
Atlético Madrid and Valencia supporters

Signings
Source: http://www.bdfutbol.com/es/t/t1998-99.html

See also
 1998–99 Segunda División
 1998–99 Copa del Rey

References

External links
1998/99 La liga results 
All Goal Scorers In La Liga 1998-1999

1998-99
1
Spain